Monte Crockett (July 14, 1938 – June 13, 2012) was an American football halfback and tight end. He played for the Buffalo Bills from 1960 to 1962.

He died on June 13, 2012, in Columbus, Ohio at age 73.

References

1938 births
2012 deaths
American football halfbacks
American football tight ends
New Mexico Highlands Cowboys football players
Buffalo Bills players